Cunibertoides is a monotypic snout moth genus described by Boris Balinsky in 1991. Its only species, Cunibertoides nigripatagiata, described by the same author, is known from South Africa.

References

Endemic moths of South Africa
Phycitinae
Monotypic moth genera
Moths of Africa